Smooth R&B is mellow R&B.
Smooth jazz - a mellower type of jazz, similar to R&B.
Slow jam - a ballad commonly marketed as R&B; sometimes has overlap with smooth jazz.
Urban adult contemporary - a radio format consisting mostly of R&B music. Some radio stations use "Smooth R&B" as their branding or tagline.

Rhythm and blues music genres
Smooth jazz